Usha Khadgi is a Nepalese model, television presenter and beauty pageant title holder. In 2000, she was titled with the seventh Miss Nepal.

Biography 
Khadgi was born in Birgunj, Nepal to father Uttam Bahadur Khadgi and mother Urmila Khadgi.

She was the First Runner-up of Miss Pokhara 1999 and later she took part in Miss Birgunj in 2000 and won the title of the First Runner-up. In the same year, she took part in Miss Nepal 2000 and won the Miss Nepal title. She is the seventh Miss Nepal and the second winner from Birgunj, after Ruby Rana.

Since 2022, she started hosting the fourth season of a talk show titled Aama on News 24 channel. Each episode of the show features a Nepalese celebrity with their mother. The show has featured various actors, comedian and singers, such as Priyanka Karki, Jeetu Nepal, etc.

Filmography

Television

Personal life 
She married GP Timalsena, a media person in 2003. They separated after 17 years of marriage in 2020. They have a daughter and a son.

See also 

 Ruby Rana
 Sadichha Shrestha

References

Nepalese beauty pageant winners
Living people
Year of birth missing (living people)
People from Birgunj
Nepalese television presenters